The following is a list of Kennesaw State Owls men's basketball head coaches. There have been seven head coaches of the Owls in their 38-season history.

Kennesaw State's current head coach is Amir Abdur-Rahim. He was hired as the Owls' head coach in April 2019, replacing Al Skinner, who resigned after the 2018–19 season.

References

Kennesaw State

Kennesaw State Owls basketball, men's, coaches